Mickey Mouse Toddler, Mickey Mouse Preschool, and Mickey Mouse Kindergarten are three sister educational video games by Disney Interactive. They are part of the Disney Learning Series, alongside similar Winnie the Pooh games, Mathquest With Aladdin, Reading Quest with Aladdin and Ready to Read with Pooh.

Commercial performance 
The three games entered the charts around late 2000, with Kindergarten achieving #1 in the week of September 17, 2000 – September 23, 2000. In the month of February 2001, Preschool and Kindergarten, and Toddler were the 3rd, 4th, and 6th Top Selling Home Education Software, respectively, according to PC Data. In the month of April 2001, they were the 1st, 2nd, and 5th top-selling in this category. Preschool was the 8th Top Selling Home Education Software title of 6 May 2001 – 12 May 2001 and the 9th of May 13, 2001 – May 19, 2001.

Critical reception

Toddler 
Superkids deemed the program "adorable" and "irresistible", noting its appeal to parents. DiscoverySchool wrote that the "colors are vibrant and screens are warm and detailed". ReviewCorner said the game had less content than other toddler games, but that it was easier to use. 7 Wolf thought the game was "unpretentious", and praised its "pleasant music, beautiful and stylish image".

Preschool 
Superkids said the game offered a "pleasant romp", while negatively comparing it to Kindergarten. Edutaining Kids described the graphics as "stunning", though questioned the game's replay value.

Kindergarten 
SuperKids said the game was "enjoyable" and featured a cast of familiar characters.

References 

Children's educational video games
Disney video games
Classic Mac OS games
Mickey Mouse video games
2000 video games
Video games developed in the United States
Windows games